The John Hopper House is located in Hackensack, Bergen County, New Jersey, United States. The house was built in 1818 by John I. Hopper. The Hopper house has been used as a restaurant since 1937. The house was added to the National Register of Historic Places on January 9, 1983.

See also 

 National Register of Historic Places listings in Bergen County, New Jersey

References

Hackensack, New Jersey
Houses on the National Register of Historic Places in New Jersey
Houses in Bergen County, New Jersey
National Register of Historic Places in Bergen County, New Jersey
New Jersey Register of Historic Places